Aury Wallington is an American novelist and TV writer.  She has written extensively for TV, and her latest book is based upon science fiction series Heroes.  The novel, titled Heroes: Saving Charlie, is the first in what will be a series of Heroes books which have been written with the full cooperation of Heroes creator Tim Kring.

Aury currently created the NBC.com series Dial * starring AnnaLynne McCord. She is also writing for the new live-action Cartoon Network TV show Tower Prep.

Biography
Wallington grew up in Pennsylvania and always wanted to be a writer but was not sure how to go about it.  She graduated from Tufts University and moved to New Orleans because one of her favourite writers, Ellen Gilchrist, was from there and Wallington thought that she would soak up some inspiration from living there too.  Instead, she spent her nights bartending and her days writing really bad poetry and collecting rejection slips.

After a stint in New York as personal assistant to an actor, she moved to Mexico to do research for a screenplay she was writing.  She ran out of money before finishing the script and headed back to New York, landing a job as script coordinator on TV show Sex and the City.  Wallington was thrilled when she was asked to write an episode for the final season of the show and in the meantime worked on her novel, Pop! and wrote a one-woman show which was performed off-Broadway as part of the Double Helix Theater’s One Festival.

When Sex and the City ended, she moved to Los Angeles and wrote for Veronica Mars and Courting Alex.  She also wrote a pilot called Pure Sunshine for Sony Television.  She is currently working on a new FOX drama called Wedding Album.

Wallington currently lives in Los Angeles with her two-year-old rescue dog, Tuesday.

Work
Wallington has written six novels.  These are:

 Heroes: Saving Charlie - The first in the official Heroes book series.
 Pop! - A teenage novel.
 The OC
Cohen
Bait and Switch
Spring Break
The Misfit.

Wallington has written three anthologies and eight scripts for television.  These are:

 The pilot for USA Death Benefits
 The pilot for ABC Family Will Triumph Fights Alone
 The pilot for ABC Family Menace to Society
 Heroes: "Once Upon a Time in Texas"
 The Wedding Album pilot
 One episode for Courting Alex called "Big Client".
 Two episodes for Veronica Mars titled "Like a Virgin" and "Clash of the Tritons".
 One episode for Sex and the City, "The Cold War".
 Two episodes for Gravity Falls, "Headhunters" and "The Time Traveler's Pig".

She also created the Netflix original series Spirit Riding Free and served as the co-writer for its 2021 feature film, Spirit Untamed with Kristin Hahn.

References

External links

21st-century American novelists
American women novelists
American television producers
American women television producers
American television writers
DreamWorks Animation people
Living people
Tufts University alumni
American women television writers
Place of birth missing (living people)
Year of birth missing (living people)
21st-century American women writers
21st-century American screenwriters